Crane is an unincorporated community in Clallam County, Washington, United States. Crane is assigned the ZIP code 98362.

Crane is on the Morse Creek U.S. Geological Survey Map.

References

Unincorporated communities in Clallam County, Washington
Unincorporated communities in Washington (state)